James J. Schwartz (born June 2, 1966) is an American football coach who is the defensive coordinator for the Cleveland Browns of the National Football League (NFL). He was head coach of the Detroit Lions from 2009 to 2013. He was also defensive coordinator for the Tennessee Titans from 2001 to 2008, Buffalo Bills in 2014, and Philadelphia Eagles from 2016 to 2020. In addition, Schwartz was the Senior Defensive Assistant for the Titans from 2021 to 2022. He won Super Bowl LII with the Eagles in 2018.

As a defensive-minded coach that emphasized strong defensive line play, Schwartz was known to build his units around a dominant interior lineman. A majority of his stints as head coach or defensive coordinator resulted in at least one of his defensive tackles being named to the All-Pro First Team and Pro Bowl: Albert Haynesworth in Tennessee, Ndamukong Suh in Detroit, Marcell Dareus in Buffalo and Fletcher Cox in Philadelphia.

Early life
Schwartz was born just outside Baltimore, Maryland, and attended Mount Saint Joseph High School, an all-male Catholic school, where he played football. Schwartz was a four-year letterman at linebacker for the Hoyas of Georgetown University, where he earned his degree in economics. He received Distinguished Economics Graduate honors at Georgetown and earned numerous honors in 1988, including Division III CoSIDA/GTE Academic All-America, All-America, and team captain.

Coaching career

Early coaching career
Schwartz got his start in the NFL doing research for Bill Belichick on the Cleveland Browns staff in the mid-1990s. Schwartz served as the Tennessee Titans' defensive coordinator from 2001–2008. During his time with Tennessee, Schwartz was considered for several different NFL head coaching openings. He was a candidate for the San Francisco 49ers' head coaching position in 2005, but the job went to Mike Nolan. In January 2008, he interviewed for head coaching positions with the Washington Redskins, Miami Dolphins  and Atlanta Falcons. Adam Schefter reported on January 15, 2009 that the Detroit Lions had decided to hire Schwartz as head coach. Defensive tackle Albert Haynesworth, who Schwartz led to stardom in Tennessee, would later call the coordinator a "mastermind" due to the success he found in his defensive schemes.

Detroit Lions
The 2009 season was Schwartz's first as Detroit's head coach and he posted a 2–14 record, with victories coming against the Washington Redskins and the Cleveland Browns.

In 2010, Schwartz saw his Lions begin the season with a 2–10 record, but they finished with four consecutive wins against the Green Bay Packers, Tampa Bay Buccaneers, Miami Dolphins, and Minnesota Vikings.

In 2011, the Lions returned to the postseason for the first time since 1999, clinching a playoff berth following a 38–10 victory over the San Diego Chargers. Detroit would go on to be eliminated in the first round by the New Orleans Saints.

The Lions started the 2012 season with a 4–4 record, but they then dropped their final eight games to end the year at 4–12. They finished in last place in the NFC North, as every other division member won at least ten games. Following the season, Schwartz and his staff led the South Team to a 21–16 triumph in the 2013 Senior Bowl.

The Lions started the 2013 season with a 6–3 record and gained control of the NFC North, the Lions proceeded to drop six of their next seven games to end the year at 7–9. Schwartz was fired on December 30, 2013, following five seasons as head coach.

Buffalo Bills
On January 24, 2014, Schwartz was hired by the Buffalo Bills as the defensive coordinator. Schwartz's defense was one of the top defenses statistically in the NFL, and led the league in sacks. During the 2014 season, the Bills went 4–0 against NFC North opponents, which Schwartz had coached against for the previous five seasons. On October 5, 2014, the Bills defeated Schwartz's former team, the Detroit Lions, by a final score of 17–14, in Detroit. Schwartz was carried off the field by his players after the game. Some Lions players, especially Golden Tate, were upset by Schwartz's decision to be carried off the field against his former team. The Bills ended the season fourth in the NFL in points and yards allowed per game with 18.1 and 312.2, respectively, while ranking third in takeaways with 30. The Bills also finished with their first winning record in ten years at 9–7, with defensive linemen Kyle Williams, Marcell Dareus and Mario Williams being named to the Pro Bowl and the latter two being named First-Team All-Pro. Despite the success, head coach Doug Marrone resigned at the end of the season and new Bills coach Rex Ryan decided to bring in his own personnel, rather than retaining Schwartz.

2015 season
For the 2015 season, Schwartz took a consulting position with the NFL's officiating department to provide a coach's perspective on officiating decisions. On October 6, Schwartz declined the opportunity to replace Miami Dolphins defensive coordinator Kevin Coyle.

Philadelphia Eagles
On January 19, 2016, Schwartz was hired by the Philadelphia Eagles to be their defensive coordinator under coach Doug Pederson. Inheriting one of the league's worst defenses, Schwartz made an immediate impact. Implementing his 4-3 defense, Schwartz turned around the defense that previously ranked 30th in yards allowed and 28th in points allowed to 13th and 12th in his first season and fourth in both categories during his second. He would eventually lead the defense to his and the Eagles' first Super Bowl championship in Super Bowl LII. On January 7, 2021, Schwartz announced that he was going to step away from coaching and resigned from the Eagles.

Return to Tennessee
Schwartz was hired by the Tennessee Titans as a senior defensive assistant on April 7, 2021.

Cleveland Browns
On January 18, 2023, Schwartz was hired by the Cleveland Browns as the defensive coordinator.

Head coaching record

Personal life
Schwartz and his wife, Kathy, have twins Christian and Alison, along with a younger daughter, Maria.

References

External links

 Detroit Lions Profile
Buffalo Bills profile
Philadelphia Eagles Profile

1966 births
Living people
Baltimore Ravens coaches
Buffalo Bills coaches
Cleveland Browns coaches
Detroit Lions head coaches
Georgetown University alumni
Georgetown Hoyas football players
Maryland Terrapins football coaches
Minnesota Golden Gophers football coaches
National Football League defensive coordinators
Philadelphia Eagles coaches
Tennessee Titans coaches